Angelo Moretti (16 August 1925 - 2004) was an Italian sprinter, who was 4th in the 200 m at the 1950 European Athletics Championships.

Achievements

See also
 Italy at the 1950 European Athletics Championships

References

External links
 Angelo Moretti at Les-Sports.info

1925 births
2004 deaths
Place of death missing
Italian male sprinters